Tokyo Xtreme Racer, known as Shutokō Battle (首都高バトル) in Japan and Tokyo Highway Challenge in Europe, is a racing video game for the Sega Dreamcast. Released in 1999 as one of the console's launch titles, the game was one of the first mission-based racing games. In the game, players challenge other drivers on the Shuto Expressway in order to gain money to modify and enhance their cars. The game features a wide variety of Japanese cars and tuning parts to purchase as the player progresses through rivals.

When released in Japan, Shutokō Battle was one of the best selling Dreamcast titles at this time. The game is based on illegal highway racing in Tokyo's Wangan highway with custom tuned cars. A such phenomenon is growing popular in Japan since the 1990s with dedicated manga (Shutokō Battle's biggest inspiration being Wangan Midnight), anime series and video games (C1 Circuit, Wangan Trial, Naniwa Wangan Battle).

Mobile edition

2002 Vodafone Live! 2D mobile version by Genki Mobile with unlicensed Japanese cars. Game download and gaming service was only available in Japan. "Time Attack" passwords from Shutokō Battle Zero (PlayStation 2) can be used to unlock extra cars. Day/night racing conditions are directly taken from the user's mobile real time data. Melodies from Kaido Battle 2 Chain Reaction were available for free download from 25/02 to 31/03 2004 to Shutokō Battle owners only.

Portable edition
In 2005, a PlayStation Portable edition designed by GRP (Genki Racing Project) that included licensed Japanese cars, was being created with the working title "Shutokō Battle Zone Of Control", but it has been shortened to "Shutokō Battle" when released. This PSP edition was licensed to Konami and released in North America and Europe as Street Supremacy in 2006.

Campaign
The Japanese' famous die-cast models company, Tomica, released a limited edition of Banshee's NSX in 1999. In the western release of the Dreamcast game, Banshee's controversial forehead-tattooed Hindu swastika was removed.

Types & Licenses
Since its introduction in the mid '90s, like similar games, the Shutokō Battle series never used licensed cars but the usual type designation such as "TYPE-86" and later "TYPE-AE86L3". Nicknames were used instead in the "Wangan Dead Heat" sidestory (e.g. "Rapid Fire" for the "Nissan Skyline GT-R R33"). These "types" are actually the real chassis code used by the Japanese makers to designate the various grades of a lineup. As the graphics quality was improving with each release, from 16-bit 2D to 3D/CG 128-bit, the featured cars were becoming more and more similar to the actual cars appearance. In a similar way, the chassis codes became longer and more precise, allowing the player to determine each grade and to use the "rename car" feature. Inevitably, the game becoming a solid best seller, the Japanese makers forced Genki to buy the license of their cars. The very first Genki licensed game was Wangan Midnight for PlayStation 2 (28.03.2002), while the first licensed Shutokō Battle was Shutokō Battle Online released on PC, the 9th of January 2003. Since then, every Genki racing game uses licensed makers, and ingame cars with Honda chassis codes do not appear anymore in the Shutokō Battle games (However, Honda is licensed in the Kaido Battle series).

Sequels

Reception

Jeff Chen reviewed the Dreamcast version of the game for Next Generation, rating it three stars out of five, and stated that "Not the greatest long-term play value, but the new wrinkles make it worth a look."

Tokyo Xtreme Racer received "average" reviews according to GameRankings, while Street Supremacy received "generally unfavorable reviews" according to Metacritic. In Japan, Famitsu gave the former title a score of 32 out of 40; it also gave the latter a score of three eights and one seven for a total of 31 out of 40.

References

External links

1999 video games
Dreamcast games
Mobile games
PlayStation Portable games
Genki (company) games
Tokyo Xtreme Racer
Video games developed in Japan
Video games set in Tokyo
Multiplayer and single-player video games

ja:首都高バトルシリーズ